A World in Their Screams is the seventh album by neoclassical band Elend, and the third and final album in the Winds Cycle.

Originally planned for release in the first quarter of 2006, it was announced on May 10, 2006 that the album's release would be delayed until late 2006 or early 2007 due to difficulties in the mixing process and a dispute between Elend and the record label. The album was finally released on April 23, 2007.

Track listing

"Ophis puthôn" — (5:59) (Python Snake)
"A World in Their Screams" — (6:21)
"Ondes de sang" — (2:55) (Waves of Blood)
"Le Dévoreur" — (5:53) (The Devourer)
"Le Fleuve infini des morts" — (4:21) (The Unending Stream of the Dead)
"Je rassemblais tes membres" — (7:46) (I Gathered Your Limbs)
"Stasis" — (5:07)
"Borée" — (4:40) (Boreas)
"La Carrière d'ombre" — (4:43) (The Quarry of Darkness)
"J'ai touché aux confins de la mort" — (4:28) (I Have Touched the Boundaries of Death)
"Urserpens" – (5:25)

Credits

Esteri Rémond---solo soprano 
Laura Angelmayer---soprano, vocal effects 
Mélanie Desquier, Sylvain Faure, Esteri Rémond, Anna Maria Sarasto---choir 
David Kempf---solo violin, first violin, solo viola, conductor 
Sylvain Daumard, Émilie Dunand, Elsa Saulnier---all other violins  
Shinji Chihara, David Choreman, Judith Thomas---violas  
Vincent Catulescu, Christian Dourinat, Franck Tessier---cellos  
Raymond Lebars, Arnaud Pioncet---basses  
Camille Drillon, Samuel Gresch---clarinets  
Klaus Amann, Jean-Michel Coste---trumpets  
Samir Husseini, Philippe Laumond---French horns  
Arnaud Pasquier---trombone  
René Adam---bass trombone 
Marc Bertaud---orchestral percussion 
Simon Eberl---industrial devices 
All other instruments and vocals, sound-design and programming by Iskandar Hasnawi, Sébastien Roland and Renaud Tschirner.

References

Elend (band) albums
2007 albums